Spare Time Machine is the third album by Pepe Deluxé, released in 2007. The first Pepe Deluxé album entirely without samples, it features dozens of musicians including several members of the band Husky Rescue.  Though sales were slow, the group's third album resonated with music journalists, earning an Emma (the Finnish version of Grammy) under the "critic's choice" category. Spare Time Machine was ranked as one of PopMatters' Slipped Discs 2007.

Track listing
 The Mischief Of Cloud 6
 Ms. Wilhelmina & Her Hat
 Go For Blue
 Last Of The Great Explorers
 Pussy Cat Rock
 Apple Thief
 Lucky The Blind
 Captain Carter’s Fathoms
 Forgotten Knights Prelude
 Forgotten Knights

References

Pepe Deluxé albums
2007 albums